Red Hot + Riot (a.k.a.  Red Hot + Riot: The Music and Spirit of Fela Kuti) is the fourteenth in a series of music compilation projects produced by Paul Heck and John Carlin of the Red Hot Organization and Grammy-winning music producer Andres Levin (Music Has No Enemies) to be used as a fundraising tool for AIDS awareness efforts. The album, which takes inspiration from the late Nigerian musician Fela Kuti, was released by MCA on October 15, 2002 and featured more than three dozen artists on a score of tracks.

It is the fifth overall album in the series to focus chiefly on the work of a single composer or musician, following tributes honoring the works of Cole Porter (Red Hot + Blue), Antônio Carlos Jobim (Red Hot + Rio), George Gershwin (Red Hot + Rhapsody: The Gershwin Groove) and Duke Ellington (Red Hot + Indigo).

Track listing
"Fela Mentality" (Intro) – Fela Kuti
"Kalakuta Show" – Mixmaster Mike, Gift of Gab, and Lateef
"Interlude: Live at Kalakuta" – Fela Kuti
"Shuffering and Shmiling" – Dead Prez, Talib Kweli, Jorge Ben, and Bilal
"Interlude: Gimme Shit" – Mixmaster Mike
"Water No Get Enemy" – Mixmaster Mike
"Water No Get Enemy" – D'Angelo, Femi Kuti, Macy Gray, and the Soultronics (featuring Nile Rodgers and Roy Hargrove)
"Gentleman" – Me'Shell NdegéOcello and Yerba Buena (featuring Ron Blake)
"Years of Tears and Sorrow" – Common and Djelimady Tounkara
"Shakara / Lady (Part One)" – Cheikh Lô
"Shakara / Lady (Part Two)" – Cheikh Lô, Les Nubians, and Manu Dibango
"Don't Worry About My Mouth O" (African Message) – Fela Kuti
"Zombie (Part One)" – Bugz in the Attic (featuring Wunmi)
"Zombie (Part Two)" – Nile Rodgers and Roy Hargrove
"No Agreement" – Res, Tony Allen, Ray Lema, Baaba Maal, Positive Black Soul, and Archie Shepp
"So Be It" – Kelis
"Interlude: This Is an Ashanti Proverb" – Fela Kuti
"By Your Side" – Sade (Cottonbelly Remix)
"Colonial Mentality" – Yerba Buena
"Trouble Sleep Yanga Wake Am" – Baaba Maal and Taj Mahal (featuring Kaouding Cissoko and Antibalas)

External links
 Red Hot Organization

Red Hot Organization albums
2002 compilation albums
Cultural depictions of Fela Kuti